The 1931–32 Lancashire Cup was the twenty-fourth occasion on which the Lancashire Cup competition had been held. Once again a new name was to be added to the trophy this year as it was the turn of Salford, who won the trophy for the first time by beating neighbours and close rivals Swinton in the final by 10-8.

Background 
At the time of the great schism in 1895, Salford had initially remained loyal to the Rugby Football Union but in April 1896 the board met and only three members opposed the motion to switch to the new code. The change of heart was partly brought about by the sudden lack of “interesting” or derby fixtures for the club.

Competition and results 
The number of teams entering this year’s competition remained at 13 but from this season the fixture format was changed. There was only one bye in the first round but now also a “blank” or “dummy” fixture. This also resulted in one bye in the second round.

Round 1  
Involved  6 matches (with one bye and one “blank” fixture) and 13 clubs

Round 1 – replays  
Involved  2 matches

Round 2 – quarterfinals  
Involved 3 matches (with one bye) and 7 clubs

Round 3 – semifinals 
Involved 2 matches and 4 clubs

Final 
The final was played at the Cliff, Broughton, Salford, (historically in the county of Lancashire) and on the banks of the River Irwell. The attendance was 26,471 and receipts £1,030. The attendance was a new record beating the 25,656 of 1924.

Teams and scorers 

Scoring - Try = three (3) points - Goal = two (2) points - Drop goal = two (2) points

The road to success

Notes 
The first Lancashire Cup match played at the new ground
The attendance of 26,471 was a new record for a Lancashire Cup final attendance
The Cliff was the home ground of Broughton Rangers from 1913 and until they moved out to Belle Vue in 1933. In 1938 Manchester United  moved in and used it as both a match ground for academy teams etc. and a general a training ground. They purchased the ground outright in 1951 and downgraded it to Junior team use in the early 2000s

See also 
1931–32 Northern Rugby Football League season
Rugby league county cups
List of defunct rugby league clubs

References

External links
Saints Heritage Society
1896–97 Northern Rugby Football Union season at wigan.rlfans.com
Hull&Proud Fixtures & Results 1896/1897
Widnes Vikings - One team, one passion Season In Review - 1896-97
The Northern Union at warringtonwolves.org

RFL Lancashire Cup
Lancashire Cup